Wai Sano is a volcano located in the western part of the island of Flores, Indonesia.  Wai Sano consists of an elliptical caldera about one mile (2.5 km) wide, containing a lake 260 meters below the 903 meter caldera rim, itself part of Mount Umpu Rua. Two fumaroles are located on the southeastern shore of the lake.  No historical eruptions are known.

References 

 

Calderas of Indonesia
Volcanoes of the Lesser Sunda Islands
Mountains of Flores Island (Indonesia)